The Queen Avenue Bridge is a reinforced concrete single-span barrel arch bridge in Minneapolis that spans the tracks used by the Minnesota Streetcar Museum.  The bridge was built in 1905 and is listed on the National Register of Historic Places.

Much of the significance of the bridge is due to it being the third-oldest reinforced concrete arch bridge in Minnesota.  It also retains most of the integrity of the design from its original plans.

It was evaluated in 1989 as part of the Reinforced-Concrete Highway Bridges in Minnesota MPS, and then listed on the National Register that year.

References

Bridges completed in 1905
Bridges in Minneapolis
Concrete bridges in Minnesota
Deck arch bridges in the United States
National Register of Historic Places in Minneapolis
Road bridges on the National Register of Historic Places in Minnesota
1905 establishments in Minnesota